Varsha Ragoobarsing (born 1992) is a Mauritian model and beauty pageant titleholder who won the Miss Estrella Mauritius 2018. She represented Mauritius at Miss Universe 2018.

Personal life
Ragoobarsing is a chairperson and a founder of Anou Apran Non-Governmental Organisation (NGO) in Mauritius. She has a bachelor's degree Field of Study Business Administration and Management, General GradeFirst Class, First Division Pass, Distinction in Dissertation at Eastern Institute For Integrated Learning In Management and a Bachelor of Science in Business Management Field Of StudyBusiness Administration, Management and Operations (Corporate) at The Chartered Institute of Management Accountants.

Pageantry

Miss Eco Mauritius 2016
Ragoobarsing was crowned Miss Eco Mauritius 2016 and then competed at the Miss Eco Universe 2016 in Egypt.

Miss Eco Universe 2016
Ragoobarsing represented Mauritius at the Miss Eco Universe 2016 in Egypt but Unplaced.

Miss Estrella Mauritius 2018
Ragoobarsing was crowned Miss Estrella Mauritius 2018 took place on 5 May 2018 at the Angsana Hotel in Balaclava.

Miss Universe 2018
Ragoobarsing represented Mauritius at the Miss Universe 2018 pageant.

References

External links
missestrella.com
missuniverse.com

Living people
Miss Universe 2018 contestants
People from Flacq District
Mauritian female models
Mauritian beauty pageant winners
Mauritian people of African descent
1992 births